George William Taylor (March 31, 1855January 27, 1931) was an American businessman and Republican politician.  He was a member of the Wisconsin State Assembly, representing Marinette County in the 1895 and 1897 sessions.

Biography
George W. Taylor was born in Wenham, Massachusetts, in 1855.  He was educated in the schools in Middletown and Hartford, Connecticut, and then went to work in the lumber business.  He lived for 14 years in Chicago and worked for the lumber firm D. K. Pearsons & Co.

He moved to northern Wisconsin in 1890, settling first at Oconto, Wisconsin, before moving to Marinette in 1892.

Two years after his arrival, he was elected to the Wisconsin State Assembly from Marinette County, running on the Republican ticket.  He was re-elected in 1894.

After leaving office, he moved to Burlington, Ontario, where he died in February 1931.

Personal life and family
George W. Taylor was a son of Reverend Dr. Jeremiah Taylor, a prominent Congregationalist minister in Massachusetts and Rhode Island.  The Taylors were descendants of John Alden, a crew member on the historic 1620 Mayflower voyage and a signer of the Mayflower Compact.

George Taylor married Ella Frances Case of Simsbury, Connecticut, on March 16, 1882. They had at least two children, though one son died in infancy.

Taylor was heavily involved in Freemasonry and was a 33rd degree mason.

Electoral history

Wisconsin Assembly (1894, 1896)

| colspan="6" style="text-align:center;background-color: #e9e9e9;"| General Election, November 6, 1894 

| colspan="6" style="text-align:center;background-color: #e9e9e9;"| General Election, November 3, 1896

References

External links
 

1855 births
1931 deaths
People from Wenham, Massachusetts
People from Chicago
People from Oconto, Wisconsin
People from Marinette, Wisconsin
Republican Party members of the Wisconsin State Assembly